Phenylacetic acid (PAA; conjugate base phenylacetate), also known by various synonyms, is an organic compound containing a phenyl functional group and a carboxylic acid functional group. It is a white solid with a strong honey-like odor. Endogenously, it is a catabolite of phenylalanine. As a commercial chemical, because it can be used in the illicit production of phenylacetone (used in the manufacture of substituted amphetamines), it is subject to controls in countries including the United States and China.

Occurrence
Phenylacetic acid has been found to be an active auxin (a type of plant hormone), found predominantly in fruits. However, its effect is much weaker than the effect of the basic auxin molecule indole-3-acetic acid. In addition the molecule is naturally produced by the metapleural gland of most ant species and used as an antimicrobial. It is also the oxidation product of phenethylamine in humans following metabolism by monoamine oxidase and subsequent metabolism of the intermediate product, phenylacetaldehyde, by the aldehyde dehydrogenase enzyme; these enzymes are also found in many other organisms.

Preparation
This compound may be prepared by the hydrolysis of benzyl cyanide:

Applications
Phenylacetic acid is used in some perfumes, as it possesses a honey-like odor even in low concentrations. It is also used in penicillin G production and diclofenac production. It is also employed to treat type II hyperammonemia to help reduce the amounts of ammonia in a patient's bloodstream by forming phenylacetyl-CoA, which then reacts with nitrogen-rich glutamine to form phenylacetylglutamine. This compound is then excreted from the patient's body. It's also used in the illicit production of phenylacetone, which is used in the manufacture of methamphetamine.

The sodium salt of phenylacetic acid, sodium phenylacetate, is used as a pharmaceutical drug for the treatment of urea cycle disorders, including as the combination drug sodium phenylacetate/sodium benzoate (Ammonul).

Phenylacetic acid is used in the preparation of several pharmaceutical drugs, including camylofin, bendazol, triafungin, phenacemide, lorcainide, phenindione, and cyclopentolate.

In popular culture
In the crime drama Breaking Bad, phenylacetic acid is featured twice as a precursor to methamphetamine, first in the episode titled "A No-Rough-Stuff-Type Deal", then in "Salud".

In the police drama S.W.A.T S6E14, phenylacetic acid is featured as a chemical needed to process a new drug called Iso.

See also
 Cathinone
 Methyl phenylacetate

References

Flavors
Drug control law in the United States
Auxins
Phenylacetic acids